This is a list of notable events in music that took place in the year 2002.

Specific locations
 2002 in British music
 2002 in Norwegian music
 2002 in South Korean music

Specific genres
 2002 in classical music
 2002 in country music
 2002 in heavy metal music
 2002 in hip hop music
 2002 in Latin music
 2002 in jazz

Events

January–February
 January 1 – Eric Clapton marries his 25-year-old American girlfriend in a surprise wedding ceremony at a church in the English village of Ripley, Surrey.
 January 8 – The Black Crowes announce they are taking a hiatus.
 January 14 – Adam Ant is committed to a psychiatric hospital two days after being arrested for carrying a firearm into a London pub that Ant claims was fake.
 January 18 – Rapper C-Murder is arrested and charged with second-degree murder over a fatal shooting in a Harvey, Louisiana nightclub on January 12.
 January 18–February 3 – The Big Day Out festival takes place in Australia and New Zealand, headlined by The Prodigy.
 January 23 – Virgin Records buys out its contract with Mariah Carey for $28 million, essentially paying her to not record any more music for the label.
 February 3 – U2 perform during the halftime show for Super Bowl XXXVI. U2's performance becomes a tribute to the victims of the September 11 terrorist attack.
 February 4 – Kiss bassist Gene Simmons has a notoriously antagonistic interview with Terry Gross on National Public Radio. Simmons continuously baits the host with sexual come-ons throughout the interview while Gross repeatedly calls Simmons "obnoxious." Simmons refuses to grant NPR permission to post the interview online, but unauthorized transcripts and audio exist.
 February 13 – Jennifer Lopez becomes the first singer to have a remix album, J to tha L-O!: The Remixes, debut at number one, selling over 156,000 copies.
 February 15 – US singer Britney Spears takes her first starring role in Crossroads, a teen drama road film alongside Zoe Saldana. Although the film is largely panned, it is commercially successful, grossing $61.1 million worldwide against a $12 million budget.
 February 27 – The 44th Annual Grammy Awards are presented in Los Angeles, hosted by Jon Stewart. The soundtrack for the film O Brother, Where Art Thou? wins Album of the Year, while U2's "Walk On" wins Record of the Year. Alicia Keys wins Song of the Year (for "Fallin'") and Best New Artist.

March–April
 March 7 – Burton C. Bell leaves Fear Factory after falling out with Dino Cazares. Fear Factory soon disband.
 March 12 – Silverchair withdraw from the Gone South festival in Australia after Daniel Johns contracts reactive arthritis.
 March 15 – Liverpool Airport is rechristened Liverpool John Lennon Airport in an official ceremony.
 March 24 – Takahiro Nishikawa leaves Dreams Come True.
 March 25 – Celine Dion returns to the music scene after a four-year absence with the album A New Day Has Come.
 April 17 – Pop-punk giants Blink-182 and Green Day co-headline the two-month Pop Disaster Tour.
 April 22 – Sugababes release their first UK Number 1 single, a cover of Adina Howard's 1995 single Freak Like Me.
 April 25 – Member of R&B group TLC, Lisa "Left Eye" Lopes dies in car accident in Honduras
 April 27-28 – The Coachella Valley Music and Arts Festival takes place in California. Headlined by Björk and Oasis, the lineup also features The Chemical Brothers, The Prodigy, Cake, Foo Fighters, Jack Johnson, Queens of the Stone Age, The Strokes, The Vines and Belle and Sebastian. This year marks the festival's return to its original two-day format.

May–June
 May 8 – Mariah Carey signs a new record contract with Island Def Jam Music Group.
 May 12 – We Will Rock You, a jukebox musical based on the songs of Queen, opens at the Dominion Theatre in London, England.
 May 21 - Blink-182 guitarist Tom DeLonge forms post-hardcore side-project band Box Car Racer. Their album Box Car Racer is released.
 May 22 – Members of Alien Ant Farm are injured in an early morning tour bus crash in Spain that claimed the life of the driver.
 May 25 – The 47th Eurovision Song Contest, held at Saku Suurhall in Tallinn, Estonia, is won by Latvian singer Marie N with the song "I Wanna". 
May 26 - Eminem releases The Eminem Show, one of the bestselling hip-hop album of 2002
 June 1 
Graham Coxon leaves Blur during Think Tanks recording sessions, after tensions with the other members mainly due to its alleged alcohol problems and disagreement about the choice of Fatboy Slim as producer. Coxon only contributed in one song, Battery in Your Leg. He was later "replaced" on tour by Simon Tong, former guitarist of The Verve.
The Prom at the Palace is held in London to commemorate the Golden Jubilee of Elizabeth II.  Performers include the BBC Symphony Orchestra, the BBC Symphony Chorus, Kiri Te Kanawa, Angela Gheorghiu and Roberto Alagna.
 June 5 – U.S. soul and R&B singer R. Kelly, is charged with 21 counts of having sexual intercourse with a minor after a videotape allegedly showing him engaged in sexual acts with an underage girl is broadcast on the internet.
 June 11
 Paul McCartney marries second wife Heather Mills in a lavish ceremony at Castle Leslie in Ireland.
 American Idol premieres on Fox.
 Korn releases fifth-studio album, Untouchables.
 David Bowie releases his twenty-second studio album, Heathen. The album marks a commercial comeback for Bowie in the US, becoming his highest-charting album in the country since 1984's Tonight.
 June 12 – BMG Music agrees to acquire the rest of Zomba Music Group in a deal reportedly worth $3 billion.
 June 15 – The Los Angeles, California, USA, radio station KROQ-FM airs the 10th Annual Weenie Roast show with Bad Religion, Hoobastank, Jack Johnson, Jimmy Eat World, Moby, New Found Glory, P.O.D., Papa Roach, Puddle of Mudd, The Strokes, System of a Down, Unwritten Law, The Vines, The Violent Femmes and Rob Zombie.
 June 18 – Mexican Pop-Singer Paulina Rubio, releases her sixth studio album and debut-English crossover album in the U.S., titled Border Girl through Universal Records, she performed for the very first time live her hit single Don't Say Goodbye on The Tonight Show with Jay Leno, the album debuted at #11 on the Billboard 200 with sales of 56,000 copies becoming Rubio's highest-charting album in the U.S. It was eventually certified gold by RIAA, indicating sales of over 500,000 units.
 June 19 – Hikaru Utada releases the album Deep River, which sold 2,350,170 copies in a week, debuting at number 1 on the weekly, monthly, and annual Oricon album chart. This would be her third time at number 1 on the year-end rankings of that particular chart, a record for any Japanese musical act or worldwide.
 June 20 – Pop star Britney Spears, at only 20 years of age, is ranked by Forbes as the world's most powerful celebrity.
 June 21-23 – The first Bonnaroo Music Festival is held in Tennessee. Performers include Widespread Panic, Gov't Mule and Norah Jones.
 June 25 – The Prague Philharmonic Orchestra releases an arrangement of the Romeo and Juliet 1968 film soundtrack on the Silva America label. Will Smith also comes back with the release of his third solo studio album Born to Reign.
 June 27 – The Who bassist John Entwistle is found dead in a Las Vegas hotel room on the eve of the band's new tour, aged 57.
 June 30 – The Glastonbury Festival features headline acts Coldplay, Garbage, Stereophonics, Orbital, Roger Waters, Rod Stewart, and Air.

July–August
 July 6 – Michael Jackson stages a public protest against Sony Music chairman Tommy Mottola, accusing him of taking part in a racist conspiracy within the music industry to exploit black recording artists. Sony responds with a statement calling Jackson's remarks "ludicrous, spiteful and hurtful."
 July 9 – Red Hot Chili Peppers's 8th studio album By The Way is released. It sold 286,000 copies in the United States during the first week, peaking at #2 on Billboard 200. It went on to sell over 2 million copies in the US, being certified double platinum by the Recording Industry Association of America.
 July 12 – Buckcherry breaks up on the heels of lead singer Josh Todd's decision to quit the group. They would reunite in 2005.
 July 20–21 – The Splendour in the Grass music festival takes place in Byron Bay, Australia, headlined by Gomez and Supergrass.
 July 23 – My Chemical Romance's first album, "I Brought You My Bullets, You Brought Me Your Love" is released to the public.
 July 28 – The Area2 Festival, featuring headline acts Moby, David Bowie, Busta Rhymes, Ash, and Blue Man Group, begins a three-week tour in Washington, DC.
 August 17 – The Snow Mountain Music Festival opens in Lijiang, China.
 August 19 – Nickelback leaves the stage during the second song of their performance at the Ilha do Ermal festival in Portugal after being relentlessly pelted with rocks and bottles by the crowd.
 August 27 – Queens of the Stone Age release their critically acclaimed album Songs for the Deaf, featuring Dave Grohl on drums. The album earned the band their first Gold certification in the United States on January 27, 2003, selling over 500,000 copies.

September–October
 September 3 – Napster is shut down for good after a judge denies a bid from Bertelsmann to purchase its assets. 
 September 4 – Kelly Clarkson becomes the first winner of the television talent contest, American Idol.
 September 11 – Marie Fredriksson of Roxette is injured in a domestic accident, leading to the discovery of a brain tumor.
 September 20 – Courtney Love announces that her legal dispute with the surviving members of Nirvana has been resolved, paving the way for the unreleased track "You Know You're Right" to be included on an upcoming compilation.
 September 25 – Radio Disney Jams, Vol. 5 gets released onto CD.
 September 28 – A stretch of Tennessee State Route 19 is officially named for Tina Turner, who was born and raised in nearby Nutbush, Tennessee.
 October 2
 Robbie Williams signs a new six-album deal with EMI for £80 million, the most lucrative contract ever signed by a UK musician.
 Christina Aguilera releases her controversial music video for the song, "Dirrty", the lead single from her second album Stripped.
 October 13 – The fifth Terrastock festival is held in Boston, USA.
 October 23 - While driving home from a studio session, Kanye West falls asleep at the wheel and gets in a head-on crash, causing his jaw to be wired shut.
 October 24 – Mikey "Bug" Cox is fired from Coal Chamber after disputes with other members about his drug addiction.
 October 26 – Christina Aguilera releases her controversial second studio album Stripped, which enters the Billboard 200 at number 2, selling 330,000 copies in its first week. Stripped is the first studio album in three years since Christina Aguilera (1999).
 October 30
 Jam Master Jay is shot dead at a studio in Queens. Run-D.M.C. disbands.
 Warren Zevon, who has recently been diagnosed with cancer, is the sole guest for the entire hour of Late Show with David Letterman. It would be his final public performance.
 Stone Temple Pilots play their last show for six years at Cynthia Woods Mitchell Pavilion in The Woodlands, Texas.

November–December
 November 7 – Guns N' Roses fans in Vancouver riot after a concert, which was to kick off the band's first tour in nine years, is canceled due to Axl Rose's flight getting delayed.
 November 10 – Mick Jagger, Keith Richards, Elvis Costello, Lenny Kravitz, Tom Petty and Brian Setzer guest-star on an episode of The Simpsons set at a Rock 'n' Roll Fantasy Camp.
 November 12 – rap rock band Crazy Town release their second studio album Darkhorse
 November 19 – Michael Jackson dangles his nine-month-old son, "Blanket", over the balcony of his Berlin hotel room in an apparent attempt to connect with the fans below. He releases a statement later that day calling the incident a "terrible mistake".
November 26 – Will Smith releases his first compilation album (last under Columbia Records) Greatest Hits
 November 29 – Concert For George is held at the Royal Albert Hall in London, as a memorial to George Harrison on the first anniversary of his death, under the musical direction of friend Eric Clapton. Performers included surviving Beatles members Paul McCartney, Ringo Starr, Clapton, Jeff Lynne, Ravi Shankar, and Billy Preston. The event benefitted the Material World Charitable Foundation.
 November 30 – British girl group Girls Aloud is formed on the reality television show Popstars: The Rivals.
 December 2 – Peter Garrett leaves Midnight Oil.
 December 3 – Mariah Carey releases her ninth studio album Charmbracelet.
 December 6 – Another riot over a canceled Guns N' Roses concert breaks out, this time in Philadelphia, after Axl Rose is a no-show. The band cancels the remaining dates of the tour without explanation.
 December 22 – Joe Strummer lead singer, guitarist and founder of Punk Rock band The Clash dies of a congenital heart defect at the age of 50.
 December 29 – A Creed concert in Chicago angers fans in attendance when lead singer Scott Stapp forgets many lyrics, takes a lengthy leave of absence in the middle of the show and lies down on the stage for part of the performance. The band's manager issues a written apology that includes the statement "we hope that you can take some solace in the fact that you definitely experienced the most unique of all Creed shows and may have become part of the unusual world of rock 'n' roll history!"
 December 31 – Phish end their two-year hiatus with a New Year's Eve concert at Madison Square Garden in New York City.

Also in 2002
 Fergie joins The Black Eyed Peas during their recording of the Elephunk album.
 Salt-n-Pepa disbands.

Bands formed
 See Musical groups established in 2002

Bands disbanded
 See :Category:Musical groups disestablished in 2002

Bands reformed
 D.I. (after 1995 hiatus)
 Fear Factory
 Little River Band original members reform as Birtles Shorrock Goble
 KMFDM
 Phish (after 2000 hiatus)
 Suffocation

Albums released

January–March
{| class="wikitable" style="width:100%;"
|-
! colspan="2"|Date
!Album
!Artist
!Notes
|-
| rowspan="32" style="text-align:center; background:#ffa07a; textcolor:#000;"| JANUARY| rowspan="2" style="vertical-align:top;"|1
| I Am... || Ayumi Hamasaki || 4th number 1 studio album
|-
| The Wreckard || Prick ||-
|-
| rowspan="3" style="vertical-align:top;"|8
| I Am Sam: Music From and Inspired By the Motion Picture || Various Artists || Soundtrack
|-
| Jukebox Sparrows || Shannon McNally ||-
|-
| Light of Day, Day of Darkness || Green Carnation ||-
|-
| style="vertical-align:top;"|14
| Neon Golden || The Notwist ||-
|-
| rowspan="6" style="vertical-align:top;"|15
| Drive || Alan Jackson ||-
|-
| Group Therapy || Concrete Blonde ||-
|-
| Honour – Valour – Pride || Bolt Thrower ||-
|-
| Nude on the Moon: The B-52's Anthology || The B-52's || Compilation
|-
| The Great Divide || Willie Nelson ||-
|-
| Tenth Dimension || Blaze ||-
|-
| style="vertical-align:top;"|18
| World Outside || Socialburn ||-
|-
| style="vertical-align:top;"|21
| Never Forget (Where You Come From) || Bro'Sis ||-
|-
| rowspan="9" style="vertical-align:top;"|22
| 7 || U2 || EP
|-
| Alkaline Trio / Hot Water Music || Alkaline Trio/Hot Water Music || Split EP
|-
| And All That Could Have Been || Nine Inch Nails || Live DVD
|-
| Bloodsport || Sneaker Pimps ||-
|-
| Flight of the Behemoth || Sunn O ||-
|-
| The Playa Rich Project 2 || Various Artists || Compilation
|-
| The Process of Belief || Bad Religion ||-
|-
| Rock'n Roll Gangster || Fieldy's Dreams ||-
|-
| Spiritual Minded || KRS-One ||-
|-
| style="vertical-align:top;"|28
| Come with Us || The Chemical Brothers ||-
|-
| rowspan="7" style="vertical-align:top;"|29
| Blaque Out || Blaque ||-
|-
| Classic Masters || General Public || Compilation
|-
| Denials Delusions and Decisions || Jaguar Wright || Debut
|-
| Elva || Unwritten Law ||-
|-
| The Essential Barbra Streisand || Barbra Streisand || Compilation
|-
| Forever || Cracker ||-
|-
| Six Degrees of Inner Turbulence || Dream Theater ||-
|-
| rowspan="1" style="vertical-align:top;"|?
| Two Rainy Nights || Joe Jackson || Live
|-
| rowspan="61" style="text-align:center; background:thistle; textcolor:#000;" | FEBRUARY'''
| style="vertical-align:top;"|1
| O || Damien Rice ||-
|-
| style="vertical-align:top;"|2
| The Bled || The Bled || EP
|-
| style="vertical-align:top;"|4
| Sons of Northern Darkness || Immortal ||-
|-
| rowspan="6" style="vertical-align:top;"|5
| After Everything Now This || The Church ||-
|-
| Frantic || Bryan Ferry ||-
|-
| The Illusion of Safety || Thrice ||-
|-
| J to tha L-O!: The Remixes || Jennifer Lopez || Remix album
|-
| Suicide by My Side || Sinergy ||-
|-
| Ultimate Manilow || Barry Manilow || Compilation
|-
| style="vertical-align:top;"|6
| HTP || Hughes Turner Project ||-
|-
| rowspan="6" style="vertical-align:top;"|12
| Always Got Tonight || Chris Isaak ||-
|-
| Apathy and Exhaustion || The Lawrence Arms ||-
|-
| Barricades & Brickwalls || Kasey Chambers || US
|-
| Feedback Is Payback || 1208 ||-
|-
| Give 'Em the Boot III || Various Artists || Compilation
|-
| On the Road || Miss Kittin || Compilation
|-
| style="vertical-align:top;"|14
| One Deep Breath || Bradley Joseph ||-
|-
| rowspan="3" style="vertical-align:top;"|15
| Funnel Weaver || Buckethead ||-
|-
| Music from the Major Motion Picture Crossroads || Britney Spears || Soundtrack
|-
| Remedy Lane || Pain of Salvation ||-
|-
| rowspan="2" style="vertical-align:top;"|18
| Geogaddi || Boards of Canada || Europe
|-
| Another Late Night: Zero 7 || Zero 7 ||-
|-
| rowspan="17" style="vertical-align:top;" |19
| All Hail West Texas || The Mountain Goats ||-
|-
| As If to Nothing || Craig Armstrong ||-
|-
| Beautysleep || Tanya Donelly ||-
|-
| Best of the Blues || Gary Moore || Compilation
|-
| Capricornia || Midnight Oil ||-
|-
| Don't Worry About Me || Joey Ramone ||-
|-
| Goodbye Blue & White || Less Than Jake || Compilation
|-
| Hate Breeds Suffering || Lock Up ||-
|-
| Is a Woman || Lambchop ||-
|-
| Kissin Time || Marianne Faithfull ||-
|-
| Mobilize || Anti-Flag ||-
|-
| A Pair of Kings || Riders in the Sky ||-
|-
| Sea of No Cares || Great Big Sea || Canada
|-
| The Stability EP || Death Cab for Cutie || EP
|-
| We Are the Only Friends We Have || Piebald ||-
|-
| The Worst You Can Do Is Harm || The Long Winters ||-
|-
| Knife Play || Xiu Xiu || Debut
|-
| style="vertical-align:top;"|22
| Good to Go || Jimmy Eat World || EP
|-
| rowspan="6" style="vertical-align:top;"|25
| The Brotherhood || Running Wild ||-
|-
| Catch 22 || Hypocrisy ||-
|-
| Full Moon || Brandy ||-
|-
| Songs || Regina Spektor ||-
|-
| Under Rug Swept || Alanis Morissette ||-
|-
| Walking with Thee || Clinic ||-
|-
| rowspan="15" style="vertical-align:top;"|26
| Belly of the Sun || Cassandra Wilson ||-
|-
| Burn It Black || Injected ||-
|-
| The Changing of Times || Underoath ||-
|-
| Come Away with Me || Norah Jones || Debut
|-
| Gore Obsessed || Cannibal Corpse ||-
|-
| Immer || Michael Mayer || Mix Compilation
|-
| Lapalco || Brendan Benson ||-
|-
| Live in a Dive || Bracket || Live
|-
| Lucky 7 || The Reverend Horton Heat ||-
|-
| Memories Are My Only Witness || Yuka Honda ||-
|-
| Moulin Rouge! Music from Baz Luhrmann's Film, Vol. 2 || Various Artists || Soundtrack
|-
| No Half Steppin || Sharissa ||-
|-
| Source Tags & Codes || ...And You Will Know Us by the Trail of Dead ||-
|-
| Superkala || Course of Nature ||-
|-
| Watermelon, Chicken & Gritz || Nappy Roots || Debut
|-
| rowspan="74" style="text-align:center; background:#98fb98; textcolor:#000;"|MARCH'| rowspan="2" style="vertical-align:top;"|1
| Preface || Jessica Harp  ||-
|-
| Queen of the Damned || Various Artists || Soundtrack
|-
| rowspan="2" style="vertical-align:top;"|3
| Hate Made Me || 8 Foot Sativa ||-
|-
| Jebediah || Jebediah ||-
|-
| rowspan="2" style="vertical-align:top;"|4
| Hi-Fi Serious || A (band) ||-
|-
| Words of Wisdom and Hope || Teenage Fanclub ||-
|-
| rowspan="12" style="vertical-align:top;"|5
| 1919 Eternal || Black Label Society ||-
|-
| Against Me! Is Reinventing Axl Rose || Against Me! ||-
|-
| Attak || KMFDM ||-
|-
| BYO Split Series, Vol. 3 || NOFX/Rancid || Split LP
|-
| Didn't It Rain || Songs: Ohia ||-
|-
| The Eleventh Hour || Jars of Clay ||-
|-
| England, Half-English || Billy Bragg and The Blokes ||-
|-
| Here Comes the Zoo || Local H ||-
|-
| History Lessens || Skyclad || Compilation
|-
| IIcons || Naughty By Nature ||-
|-
| The Second Stage Turbine Blade || Coheed and Cambria ||-
|-
| Sha Sha || Ben Kweller ||-
|-
| rowspan="3" style="vertical-align:top;"|6
| Burning Angel || Arch Enemy || EP
|-
| Encore || Joe Hisaishi ||-
|-
| This Armor || Chihiro Onitsuka ||-
|-
| rowspan="12" style="vertical-align:top;"|12
| B2K || B2K ||-
|-
| Become You || Indigo Girls ||-
|-
| Chapters From a Vale Forlorn || Falconer ||-
|-
| Favorite Noise || Reel Big Fish || Compilation
|-
| Home from Home || Millencolin ||-
|-
| In Search Of... || N.E.R.D. ||-
|-
| Modulate || Bob Mould ||-
|-
| Perseverance || Hatebreed ||-
|-
| Resident Evil: Music from and Inspired by the Original Motion Picture || Various Artists || Soundtrack
|-
| This Is the Remix || Destiny's Child || Remix
|-
| VH1 Presents: The Corrs, Live in Dublin || The Corrs || Live
|-
| What It Is to Burn || Finch ||-
|-
| style="vertical-align:top;"|13
| Listen to My Heart || BoA || Japanese Debut
|-
| rowspan="2" style="vertical-align:top;"|18
| In Our Gun || Gomez ||-
|-
| Spin || Darren Hayes || Solo Debut; Australia
|-
| rowspan="17" style="vertical-align:top;"|19
| Circle Gets the Square || Kevin Devine ||-
|-
| Drunken Lullabies || Flogging Molly ||-
|-
| Far Side of the World || Jimmy Buffett ||-
|-
| Fused Together in Revolving Doors || The Red Chord ||-
|-
| Hold Your Horse Is || Hella ||-
|-
| Land (1975–2002) || Patti Smith || Compilation
|-
| Lust in Phaze || Soul Coughing ||-
|-
| A Night at the Opera || Blind Guardian ||-
|-
| No Pads, No Helmets...Just Balls || Simple Plan ||-
|-
| Now That's What I Call Music! 9 (U.S. series) || Various Artists || Compilation
|-
| Pied Piper || Donovan ||-
|-
| The Rest of Us || Gas Huffer ||-
|-
| Rude Awakening || Megadeth || Live
|-
| Superstarved || Gravity Kills ||-
|-
| The Trials and Tribulations of Russell Jones || Ol' Dirty Bastard ||-
|-
| VH1 Behind the Music: The Daryl Hall and John Oates Collection || Hall & Oates || Compilation
|-
| World Outside My Window || Glenn Lewis ||-
|-
| style="vertical-align:top;"|23
| Or || Golden Boy with Miss Kittin ||-
|-
| rowspan="9" style="vertical-align:top;"|25
| Man and Machine || U.D.O. ||-
|-
| Natural Born Chaos || Soilwork ||-
|-
| A New Day Has Come || Celine Dion ||-
|-
| Nocturnal Activity || Rae & Christian ||-
|-
| Now That's What I Call Music! 51 (U.K. series) || Various Artists || Compilation
|-
| Original Pirate Material || The Streets || Debut
|-
| The Remote Part || Idlewild ||-
|-
| Rock in Rio || Iron Maiden || 2xCD; Live
|-
| Weight of the World || Harem Scarem || Japan; released in Canada Oct. '02
|-
| rowspan="10" style="vertical-align:top;"|26
| The Best of Both Worlds || R. Kelly & Jay-Z ||-
|-
| Behind Silence and Solitude || All That Remains ||-
|-
| Down II: A Bustle in Your Hedgerow || Down ||-
|-
| Everyone Who Pretended to Like Me Is Gone || The Walkmen ||-
|-
| Kona Town || Pepper ||-
|-
| Mindy McCready || Mindy McCready ||-
|-
| Special Edition || Infamous Mobb ||-
|-
| Tell All Your Friends || Taking Back Sunday ||-
|-
| Thrive || Newsboys ||-
|-
| While You Weren't Looking || Caitlin Cary || Solo Debut
|-
| style="vertical-align:top;"|31
| Diorama || Silverchair ||-
|-
|}

April–June

July–September

October–December

Release date unknown
 Be Still – Donna Lewis
 Guitar Player – Hank Marvin
 Hollinndagain – Avey Tare, Panda Bear and Geologist
 Lovesick, Broke and Driftin' – Hank Williams III
 Memory – La – Constantin Veis
 The Moan – The Black Keys
 N.I.N.A. – Lisa Lopes
 Peace On Earth – Johnny Maestro & the Brooklyn Bridge
 Purely Evil – The Rogers Sisters
 Steam Powered Aereo-Takes - John Hartford

Popular songs

Top 10 selling albums of the year in the US
 The Eminem Show – Eminem
 Nellyville – Nelly
 Let Go – Avril Lavigne
 Britney – Britney Spears
 Laundry Service – Shakira
 Silver Side Up – Nickelback
 A New Day Has Come – Celine Dion
 8701 – Usher
 Home – Dixie Chicks
 Missundaztood – Pink

Classical music
 Kalevi Aho – Flute Concerto
 Leonardo Balada – Passacaglia for Orchestra
 Derek Bourgeois – Symphony No. 9
 George Crumb – Eine Kleine Mitternachtmusik (A Little Midnight Music) for piano
 Peter Maxwell Davies – Naxos Quartet No. 1
 Beat Furrer – Phasma, for piano
 Philip Glass – Concerto for Harpsichord and Chamber Orchestra
 Patrick Hawes – Blue in Blue Toshio Hosokawa –Slow Motion Tolga Kashif – Queen Symphony Theo Loevendie – Clarinet Concerto
 Somei Satoh – Violin Concerto
 Salvatore Sciarrino – Altre schegge di canto, symphonic work
 John Serry Sr. – 
 American Rhapsody (piano transcription)
 Concerto for Free Bass Accordion (piano transcription)
 Johannes Maria Staud
 Esquisse retouchée (Incipit 2), for trombone (with bass drum)
 Configurations / Reflet, for 8 players
 Polygon, for piano and orchestra
 Karlheinz Stockhausen –
 Europa-Gruss (revised version, for minimum ensemble)
 Strahlen ("Rays"), for a percussionist and ten-channel sound recording
 Ye Xiaogang – Great Wall SymphonyOpera
 Friedrich Cerha – Der Riese vom Steinfeld Steve Reich – Three Tales Salvatore Sciarrino – Macbeth Michel van der Aa – One Rodney Waschka II – Saint Ambrose (recording only)

Jazz

Musical theater
 Bombay Dreams – London production
 Chitty Chitty Bang Bang – London production
 Hairspray – Broadway production opened at the Neil Simon Theatre on August 15 and ran for over 2500 performances
 Movin' Out – Broadway production opened at the Richard Rodgers Theatre and ran for 1303 performances
 Sweet Smell of Success: The Musical – Broadway production opened on March 14 at the Martin Beck Theatre and ran for 109 performances
 Taboo –  London production opened January 29
 Thoroughly Modern Millie (musical) – Broadway production opened at the Marquis Theatre and ran for 903 performances
 We Will Rock You – London production

Musical films
 8 Mile a drama starring Eminem as a rapper. Features many rap battles.
 8 Women 24 Hour Party People Aap Mujhe Achche Lagne Lage April Maadhathil, starring Srikanth and Sneha
 Bala, starring Shaam and Meera Jasmine
 Biggie & Tupac Chicago, starring Renée Zellweger, Catherine Zeta-Jones and Richard Gere
 Filles perdues, cheveux gras Green Lights I Am Trying to Break Your Heart: A Film About Wilco Return to Never Land (animated feature)
 Standing in the Shadows of Motown Unconditional LoveBirths
January 16 - Eddie Benjamin, Australian singer-songwriter and music producer based in Los Angeles, California. (Dating Maddie Ziegler) 
January 25 – Lil Mosey, American rapper and Internet personality
February 5 – Taehyun, Korean singer and dancer, member of TXT
February 23 - Emilia Jones, English actress, singer, and songwriter
April 9 - Loren Gray, American singer
April 5 – Golden Cañedo, Filipina singer and entertainer, winner of The Clash season 1
April 24 – Skylar Stecker, American singer-songwriter and actress
May 15 - Lil Huddy,  American social media personality, singer, and actor
June 29 – Marlhy Murphy,  American musician, actress, television personality, and internet personality
July 14 – Kian (musician), Australian singer-songwriter and musician 
July 23 – Lil' P-Nut, American rapper and actor
July 25 – Shunsuke Michieda, Japanese singer and actor, member of Naniwa Danshi
August 6 – Nessa Barrett, American singer and songwriter
August 14 – Hueningkai, American-Korean singer, member of TXT
August 15 – Kento Nagao, Japanese singer, member of Naniwa Danshi
September 3 – Kyline Alcantara, Filipina singer and TV personality
September 23 – Maddie Ziegler, American dancer and actress
October 9 – Any Gabrielly, Brazilian singer and dancer
October 23 – Ningning, Chinese singer member of aespa
October 24 – Ado, Japanese singer
October 29 – Ruel,  English born Australian soul R&B singer-songwriter
November 1 – NLE Choppa, American rapper
November 5 - Jawsh 685, New Zealand beat maker and music producer
November 26 - Baylee Littrell, American country singer (son of Leighanne Wallace and Brian Littrell (Member of Backstreet Boys))
December 16 - Double Lz, British rapper and songwriter

Deaths
 January 2 – Zac Foley (33), bassist of EMF (drug overdose)
 January 3 – Juan García Esquivel (83) Mexican band leader, pianist and composer
 January 7 – Jon Lee (33), Feeder drummer (suicide)
 January 20 – Ivan Karabyts (57), Ukrainian conductor and composer
 January 21 – Peggy Lee (81), jazz singer and songwriter
 January 22
 Peter Bardens, (56), keyboardist of Camel
 Sheldon Allman, (77)
 February 1 – Hildegard Knef (76), actress, singer, writer
 February 10 – Dave Van Ronk (65)
 February 13 – Waylon Jennings (64), country musician
 February 14 – Günter Wand (90), conductor
 February 24 – Leo Ornstein (106), composer
 March 1 – Doreen Waddell (36), singer who had worked with Soul II Soul and The KLF
 March 13 – Marc Moreland (44), guitarist (Wall of Voodoo, The Skulls) (liver failure)
 March 19 – John Patton (66), jazz and soul organist
 March 23 – Eileen Farrell (82), operatic soprano
 March 24 – Dorothy DeLay (84), Juilliard School violin teacher of Itzhak Perlman and Midori
 March 26 – Randy Castillo (51), drummer for Ozzy Osbourne & Mötley Crüe
 March 27 – Dudley Moore (66), English composer, pianist and actor
 March 31 – Lucio San Pedro (89), Filipino composer and teacher
 April 2 – Levi Celerio (91), Filipino composer and lyricist
 April 5 – Layne Staley (34), lead vocalist of Alice in Chains and Mad Season
 April 13 – Alex Baroni (35), singer
 April 15 – Ram Singh Thakur (87), Indian freedom fighter, musician and composer
 April 17 – Tak Shindo (79), musician, composer and arranger
 April 25 – Lisa Lopes (30), singer (car accident)
 April 27 – Hillous Butrum (74), country musician
 May 3 – Evgeny Svetlanov (73), composer and conductor
 May 6
 Otis Blackwell (71), songwriter and pianist
 Editing Bjørn Johansen (61), Norwegian saxophonist
 May 7 – Xavier Montsalvatge (90), composer
 May 9 – Leon Stein (91), composer, conductor and musicologist (born September 18, 1910)
 June 5 – Dee Dee Ramone (50), of The Ramones (heroin overdose)
 June 6 – Robbin Crosby (42), guitarist (Ratt)
 June 13 – Ralph Shapey (81), American composer and conductor
 June 15 – Big Mello (33), rapper (car accident)
 June 27 – John Entwistle (57), bassist of The Who (heart attack)
 June 29 – Rosemary Clooney (74), US singer and actress
 July 2
 Ray Brown (75), jazz bassist
 Earle Brown (75), composer
 July 4 – Gerald Bales (83), Canadian organist and composer 
 July 11 – Rosco Gordon (74), blues singer and songwriter
 July 19 
Dave Carter (49), American singer-songwriter and guitarist 
Alan Lomax (87), American folklorist, ethnomusicologist and musician
 July 21 – Gus Dudgeon (59), English music producer
 August 2
 Joe Allison (77), songwriter
 Magda László, operatic soprano
 August 9 – Bertold Hummel (76), German composer
 August 10 – Michael Houser (40), guitarist (Widespread Panic) (pancreatic cancer)
 August 14 – Dave Williams (30), vocalist of Drowning Pool
 August 31 – Lionel Hampton (94), vibraphone virtuoso
 September 7 – Erma Franklin (64), gospel singer
 September 20 – Joan Littlewood (87), impresario
 September 24 – Tim Rose, (62), singer-songwriter
 September 29 – Mickey Newbury (62), singer, songwriter
 October 3 – Darryl DeLoach (55), guitarist (Iron Butterfly)
 October 17 – Derek Bell (66), harpist (The Chieftains)
 October 24 – Adolph Green (87), lyricist
 October 25 – Richard Harris (72), actor and singer
 October 27 – Tom Dowd (77), recording engineer and producer
 October 30 – Jam-Master Jay (37), member of Run-D.M.C.
 November 3 – Lonnie Donegan (71), skiffle musician
 November 5 – Billy Guy (66), singer (The Coasters)
 November 21 – Hadda Brooks (86), U.S. jazz singer, pianist and composer
 November 28 – Dave "Snaker" Ray (59), blues singer and guitarist
 November 30 – Minuetta Kessler (88), concert pianist, classical composer and music educator
 December 9 – Mary Hansen (36), member of Stereolab (road accident)
 December 13 – Zal Yanovsky (57), rock singer and guitarist (The Lovin' Spoonful)
 December 22 – Joe Strummer (50), singer and guitarist of The Clash
 December 31 – Kevin MacMichael (51), Canadian guitarist of British band Cutting Crew

Awards
 The following artists are inducted into the Rock and Roll Hall of Fame: Isaac Hayes, Brenda Lee, Tom Petty and the Heartbreakers, Gene Pitney, Ramones and the Talking Heads
 Inductees of the GMA Gospel Music Hall of Fame include Pat Boone, and Amy Grant

ARIA Music Awards
 ARIA Music Awards of 2002

Grammy Awards
 Grammy Awards of 2002

Country Music Association Awards
 2002 Country Music Association Awards

Eurovision Song Contest
 Eurovision Song Contest 2002

Mercury Music Prize
 A Little Deeper'' – Ms. Dynamite wins.

Glenn Gould Prize
 Pierre Boulez (laureate), Jean-Guihen Queyras (protégé)

Charts
 Billboard Year-End Hot 100 singles of 2002

Triple J Hottest 100
 Triple J Hottest 100, 2002

See also
 2002 in music (UK)
 Record labels established in 2002

References

 
2002-related lists
Music-related lists
Music by year